Augustin Smith Clayton (November 27, 1783 – June 21, 1839) was a jurist and politician from the American state of Georgia.

Clayton was born in Fredericksburg, Virginia, attended the Richmond Academy in Augusta, Georgia, and graduated with the inaugural class of Franklin College (now known as the Franklin College of Arts and Sciences) at the University of Georgia (UGA) in Athens  with a Bachelor of Arts in 1804. While at UGA, Clayton founded the Demosthenian Literary Society.

After studying law under the tutelage of judge Thomas P. Carnes, Clayton was admitted to the state bar in 1806 and began practicing law in Carnesville, Georgia (which was named in the Judge's honor). In 1807, he married Judge Carnes' daughter, Julia, and they moved back to Athens in 1808. Clayton's granddaughter, Julia Carnes King, would marry another famous UGA alumnus, Henry W. Grady.

In 1810, Clayton was elected to represent Clarke County in the Georgia House of Representatives and served through 1812. In that same year, he became the secretary for the Board of Trustees for UGA. Clayton was appointed to the board in 1816 and remained on the board until his death.

Clayton also served as the clerk of the Georgia House from 1813 to 1815. In 1826 and 1827, he was elected to the Georgia Senate.  Clayton also served as judge of the superior courts of the Western circuit of Georgia both preceding (1819–1825) and following (1828–1831) his state senate service.

In 1831, Clayton won a special election to fill the remaining term of the resigning Wilson Lumpkin in the United States House of Representatives, and Clayton won reelection to a second term in the regular election in 1832.

Clayton maintained business interests in the construction of a cotton mill in 1827 known as the Georgia Factory on the Ocoee River located south of Athens. He also played an instrumental role in securing the charter for the Georgia Railroad in 1836. In 1837 he delivered an address supporting the American Colonization Society in Athens, while he criticized the cause of abolition of slavery.

After his congressional service, Clayton returned to Athens and practiced law. He died in that city in 1839 and was buried in its Oconee Hill Cemetery.

Places named for him include Clayton, Georgia, Clayton County, Georgia, and Clayton, Alabama. His final residence in Athens was located on the north side of Clayton Street, which the city named for him, approximately halfway between Thomas and Jackson Streets. (Lawrenceville, Georgia, named for a War of 1812 hero, also has a street named for Clayton, the only one of its original streets that does not commemorate a veteran of that war.)

Clayton was a friend and congressional colleague of Davy Crockett. Literary scholar John Donald Wade posited that Clayton was the ghost writer (or at least co-writer) of Crockett's autobiography, and possibly some of his other published works, but this suggestion has been robustly challenged.

Children
His 7 children included William Wirt Clayton (1812–1885), who would later become a judge, director of the Western and Atlantic Railroad, tax collector for Fulton County, Georgia and an officer of the Georgia National Bank.

References

History of the University of Georgia, Thomas Walter Reed, Imprint:  Athens, Georgia : University of Georgia, ca. 1949 pp.89-92

External links
Augustin Smith Clayton timeline and biography

1783 births
1839 deaths
Georgia (U.S. state) lawyers
Georgia (U.S. state) state court judges
Members of the Georgia House of Representatives
Georgia (U.S. state) state senators
University of Georgia alumni
Politicians from Athens, Georgia
Politicians from Fredericksburg, Virginia
Jacksonian members of the United States House of Representatives from Georgia (U.S. state)
American slave owners
19th-century American politicians